Nikoloz Basilashvili was the defending champion, but lost in the second round to Stefanos Tsitsipas.

Dominic Thiem won the title, defeating Tsitsipas in the final, 3–6, 6–4, 6–1.

Seeds

Draw

Finals

Top half

Bottom half

Qualifying

Seeds

Qualifiers

Qualifying draw

First qualifier

Second qualifier

Third qualifier

Fourth qualifier

References

External links
 Main draw
 Qualifying draw

2019 ATP Tour
Singles men